The 2011 Seattle Sounders FC season was the club's third season in Major League Soccer, the United States' top-tier of professional soccer. It was the Sounders FC organization's third year of existence; including all previous clubs, it was the 31st season of a soccer team bearing the Sounders name.

Background

The 2011 season is the third season for Seattle Sounders FC who began play in 2009 as the league's 15th team. In their inaugural season, Sounders FC became the second MLS expansion team in league history (Chicago was first) to win the U.S. Open Cup tournament in their first season. They did so by defeating D.C. United 2–1 on the road at RFK Stadium. In winning the U.S. Open Cup tournament, Sounders FC qualified for the preliminary round of the 2010–11 CONCACAF Champions League. During the preliminary round, they were paired up with the defending Primera División de Fútbol de El Salvador winners, Isidro Metapán. After winning the first leg by a score of 1–0, Seattle went to El Salvador to play the second.

Review

November
On November 22, 2010, Seattle made a trade with the Colorado Rapids for defenders Julien Baudet of France and Danny Earls of the Republic of Ireland for Peter Vagenas. Also, the list of the ten protected players for the 2010 MLS Expansion Draft was decided by the club. The draft took place on November 24, 2010, when both the Portland Timbers and Vancouver Whitecaps FC selected ten players from the Major League Soccer teams, including Sanna Nyassi (who was later traded to Colorado) and Nathan Sturgis (who was later traded to Toronto) from Seattle Sounders FC. Vancouver later traded Jamaican international O'Brian White to Seattle.

December

On December 9, 2010, Swedish club, BK Häcken reported that midfielder, Erik Friberg completed a three-year deal with the Seattle Sounders FC, bringing him over to the team. They also have announced a contract extension with captain Kasey Keller. On December 15, 2010, the Sounders selected Chris Seitz of the Philadelphia Union in the 2010 MLS Re-Entry Draft. The goalkeeper was later traded to FC Dallas for a fourth round pick of the 2012 MLS SuperDraft. Defender Tyrone Marshall was also selected in the draft by the Colorado Rapids.

February
The team traveled to Casa Grande, Arizona, just like before the 2010 season for preseason training.

March
On March 9, 2011, the Seattle Sounders FC played the defending MLS Cup champions, Colorado Rapids in the second Seattle Sounders FC Community Shield. The game was at Qwest Field, now called CenturyLink Field.

The Sounders opened up the 2011 regular season against the defending Supporters' Shield titleholders, Los Angeles Galaxy at Qwest Field. It was the third-consecutive MLS season that the league had its opening game in Seattle. The match was held on March 15.

Match results

Preseason

Cascadia Summit

Seattle Sounders FC Community Shield

MLS regular season

Table 
Western Conference

League

Results by round

Match results

MLS Cup Playoffs

U.S. Open Cup

CONCACAF Champions League

Preliminary round

Group stage

Friendlies

Statistics

Appearances and goals

Last updated on August 26, 2016.

|-
|colspan="14"|Players out on loan:

Squads

First Team squad
Updated August 27, 2011.

Major League Soccer squad 
Updated September 12, 2011.

Transfers

In

Out

Loan out

Club 

Coaching staff
{|class="wikitable"
|-
!Position
!Staff
|-
|General Manager|| Adrian Hanauer
|-
|Head coach|| Sigi Schmid
|-
|Assistant coach|| Brian Schmetzer
|-
|Assistant coach|| Ezra Hendrickson
|-
|Goalkeeper coach|| Tom Dutra
|-
|Fitness coach|| David Tenney
|-
|Chief scout|| Kurt Schmid
|-
|Technical director||| Chris Henderson Management

Official sponsors
 Xbox 360
 Adidas
 Samsung Mob!le
 Seattle Bank
 Virginia Mason Medical Center
Source: Soundersfc.com

Kits

Recognition 
MLS Player of the Week

MLS Goal of the Week

MLS Save of the Week

MLS W.O.R.K.S. Humanitarian of the Month

Miscellany

Stadium 
On June 23, 2011, after the completion of CenturyLink's acquisition of Qwest, Qwest Field was renamed CenturyLink Field. CenturyLink picked up the five-year extension in the naming rights contract at that time, extending the contract to June 2019.

Allocation ranking 
Seattle is in the No. 18 position in the MLS Allocation Ranking. The allocation ranking is the mechanism used to determine which MLS club has first priority to acquire a U.S. National Team player who signs with MLS after playing abroad, or a former MLS player who returns to the league after having gone to a club abroad for a transfer fee. Seattle started 2011 ranked No. 11 on the allocation list but on August 26 traded allocation positions with Chicago Fire to acquire Sammy Ochoa.

International roster spots 
Seattle has 7 international roster spots. Each club in Major League Soccer is allocated 8 international roster spots, which can be traded. Seattle dealt one slot to Portland Timbers on January 14, 2011, for use in the 2011 season. There is no limit on the number of international slots on each club's roster. The remaining roster slots must belong to domestic players. For clubs based in the United States, a domestic player is either a U.S. citizen, a permanent resident (green card holder) or the holder of other special status (e.g., refugee or asylum status).

Future draft pick trades 
Future picks acquired: 2012 SuperDraft Round 4 pick acquired from FC Dallas.
Future picks traded: 2012 SuperDraft Round 3 pick traded to Chicago Fire.

References 

Seattle Sounders FC seasons
Seattle Sounders FC
Seattle Sounders FC
Seattle Sounders FC
U.S. Open Cup champion seasons